Sinezona singeri is a species of minute sea snail, a marine gastropod mollusk or micromollusk in the family Scissurellidae, the little slit shells.

Description
The shell attains a height of 1.7 mm.

Distribution
This species occurs in the Indian Ocean off Réunion.

References

 Geiger D.L. (2006). Eight new species of Scissurellidae and Anatomidae (Mollusca: Gastropoda: Vetigastropoda) from around the world, with discussion of two senior synonyms. Zootaxa 1128:1–33.
 Geiger D.L. (2012) Monograph of the little slit shells. Volume 1. Introduction, Scissurellidae. pp. 1–728. Volume 2. Anatomidae, Larocheidae, Depressizonidae, Sutilizonidae, Temnocinclidae. pp. 729–1291. Santa Barbara Museum of Natural History Monographs Number 7

External links
 

Scissurellidae
Gastropods described in 2006